Christopher S. Bond Bridge may refer to:

 Christopher S. Bond Bridge (Hermann, Missouri)
 Christopher S. Bond Bridge (Kansas City, Missouri)